Apennins  was a department of the First French Empire of 1805-1814 in present-day Italy. Named after the Apennine Mountains, it originated on 6 June 1805, after France had directly annexed the Ligurian Republic (formerly the Republic of Genoa) on 4 June 1805. Its capital was Chiavari.

Disbanded after the defeat of Napoleon in 1814, the department again became part of the briefly restored Ligurian Republic, but the Congress of Vienna awarded the old territory of Genoa to the Kingdom of Sardinia (December 1814).  the area of the former département forms parts of the Italian provinces of Genoa, La Spezia, Massa-Carrara and Parma.

Subdivisions
The department was subdivided into the following arrondissements and cantons (situation in 1812):

 Chiavari, cantons: Chiavari, Borzonasca, Lavagna, Moconesi, Rapallo, Santo Stefano d'Aveto, Sestri Levante and Varese Ligure.
 Pontremoli, cantons: Pontremoli, Bagnone, Berceto, Borgo Val di Taro, Compiano, Filattiera, Groppoli and Terrarossa.
 Sarzana, cantons: Sarzana, Albiano, Calice al Cornoviglio, Fivizzano, Sesta Godano, La Spezia, Lerici, Levanto and Vezzano Ligure.

Its population in 1812 was 213,465, and its area was 416,000 hectares.

References

Former departments of France in Italy
1805 establishments in the First French Empire